Indica Elizabeth Watson (born 20 January 2010) is an English actress. She is known for her work in BBC television drama series The Missing and for playing the young Eurus Holmes in British crime drama Sherlock.

Career
Watson's first acting appearance was in a short film in London when she was five years old. Featuring Irish actress Fiona O'Shaughnessy, the six-minute film Who Are You? was commissioned by Somerset House.From this she was auditioned for the second series of television drama The Missing and was cast in the role of Lucy. The series was first screened in the UK in October 2016 and was a major critical success.Her next role was in the popular crime drama Sherlock with Benedict Cumberbatch and Martin Freeman. She portrayed the young Eurus Holmes (as "Little Eurus"), Sherlock's younger sister, winning praise for her performance from the Daily Express.She spent three months filming espionage thriller Deep State in Morocco and Southern England. Starring British actor Mark Strong and directed by Robert Connolly and writer/showrunner Matthew Parkhill, the eight-part series was released in April 2018.

Watson's first performance in a leading role was in the BFI-funded psychological horror short film Martyrs Lane, written and directed by Ruth Platt. This was quickly followed by her second leading role in the short independent film Nurtured.In April 2019 it was announced that Watson had been cast alongside Jim Broadbent, Sally Hawkins, Kristen Wiig, Toby Jones and Maggie Smith in A Boy Called Christmas, a feature film adaptation of the acclaimed novel by Matt Haig about the origins of Father Christmas.Filming began in August 2019 for The Electrical Life of Louis Wain in which Watson plays Young Felicie Wain. This is the second time she has played a younger sister to Benedict Cumberbatch's title role.

In October 2019 she performed on stage with legendary punk group The Damned at the London Palladium for A Night of a Thousand Vampires. The concert was released as a film in October 2022. In November 2019 she appeared as Charlotte Day in BBC drama miniseries Gold Digger with Julia Ormond and Ben Barnes.Watson was cast in Marjane Satrapi's film Radioactive as a young Irene Curie alongside Rosamund Pike, Anya Taylor-Joy and Sam Riley which was originally due out in cinemas during Spring 2020. Owing to the COVID-19 pandemic its release was delayed until the summer when it was released on Amazon Prime Video. Watson received particular praise for her role from the London Evening Standard.In 2020 Watson narrated the audiobook Moojag and the Auticode Secret by N.E. McMorran.<p>In November 2021 Watson attended the UK premiere of A Boy Called Christmas at London's Natural History Museum wearing the prosthetic ears of her elf character Little Noosh.<p>Adapted for television by David Farr from John Wyndham's 1957 novel of the same name,The Midwich Cuckoos was released in June 2022. Watson plays the character of Evie Stone alongside Keeley Hawes, Max Beesley and Synnøve Karlsen in this sinister sci-fi drama series.

Television

Filmography

Audiobooks

References

External links
 

Living people
2010 births
21st-century English actresses
Actresses from London
British people of English descent
British film actresses
British television actresses
British child actresses
English child actresses